The Röschenschanze is a former schanze in Bad Peterstal-Griesbach in the Black Forest in Southern Germany.

It is located on the L 402, the "Oppenauer Steige", which branches off from the B 500 (Black Forest High Road). Another redoubt which is geographically close to the Röschenschanze is the Schwedenschanze (Zuflucht).

Etymology 
The schanze is named after the Württemberg Major  (1743–1841). Rösch became known in particular for his teaching activities at the military plant school and for the construction of the Röschenschanze.

The Röschenschanze is also known as Schwabenschanze (literally 'Swabian redoubt').

History 
The Röschenschanze was created as part of the coalition wars of the German princes against France. It was supposed to stop the French troops coming from the Renchtal under General Moreau.

In 1794, Rösch was entrusted with the construction of a hexagonal star-shaped schanze with six bulwarks to defend the Württemberg state border. The Röschenschanze consisted of star-shaped piled earth walls behind which the defenders camped.

At the time when it was not completely finished, a local farmer's boy led the French troops over the Oppenauer Steige to the Röschenschanze, so that it was stormed by Napoleon's troops in 1796 and taken almost without a fight.

See also 
 Redoubt
 Schanze
 Schwedenschanze (Zuflucht)

References

External links 

 Relief map of the Schwedenschanze

Black Forest
Hill forts in Germany